Kare is a Madang language of Papua New Guinea. It was recognized as being somewhat divergent by Malcolm Ross.

References

Hanseman languages
Languages of Papua New Guinea